The Saint Paul Police Department (SPPD) is the main law enforcement agency with jurisdiction over the City of Saint Paul, Minnesota, United States.  It was established in 1854, making it the oldest police organization in the state.  The SPPD is the second largest law enforcement agency in Minnesota, after the Minneapolis Police Department.  The department consists of 615 sworn officers and 200 non-sworn officials. The current Chief of Police is Axel Henry. 
He is the 42nd chief in the history of the St.Paul Police Department and was sworn in November of 2022.

History
In 1920 St. Paul Councilman and Public Safety Commissioner Aloysius Smith, requested that the St. Paul Police start a Police program for the youth.  Sergeant Frank Hetznecke was selected to create the program.   In its first year, 750 students signed up for the training program and in February 1921 the first student monitored crossing took place with students from Cathedral school on Kellogg Blvd. Sergeant Hetznecke is credited with introducing the Sam Browne belt and badge that became synonymous with school patrol across the country and administering St. Paul's program for 30 years.  

During the Prohibition era, the department was remarkably corrupt. In 1936, the chief, Thomas Brown was fired after an investigation showed he had protected criminals including the Dillinger and the Barker-Karpis gangs.

An arrest outside of a bar on 26 September 2010 is the subject of a lawsuit that claims excessive force. In March 2011, the elite Gang Strike Force was disestablished when a state audit could not account for 13 vehicles and over $18,000 in cash the unit had seized. The auditor's report indicated that Officer Ron Ryan had sold property his detail had retained. Press reports indicated the unit used money taken from gang members to attend a 2009 professional conference held in Hawaii. The SPPD had two prominent incidents of misconduct in relation to their dogs in 2016 and 2017.

Command structure

NOTE:  By contract, all investigators (detectives) hold the rank of sergeant.
 The time that a uniformed sergeant holds this rank is shown by arcs below the chevrons, one for each 5 years after promotion. After three are obtained the next 5 year periods give progressively a diamond and then a star in the field between the arcs and chevrons.  Although this is analogous to the uniforms of the United States Army, no additional command authority is granted.

Department awards

The department has only issued medals / awards since 1971.  The current medals are:
Medal of Valor Class A
Medal of Merit Class B
Medal of Commendation
Life Saving Award
Chief's Award For Valor
Chief's Award For Merit
Chief's Award
Officer of the Year
Detective of the Year
Civilian Employee of the year

Department size

Like most major cities, the city of St. Paul saw a population decline beginning in the late 1960s.  However, the department continued to grow.

See also

 List of law enforcement agencies in Minnesota

 Homer Van Meter

References

External links
Saint Paul Police Department
Saint Paul Police Historical Society
Saint Paul Police Foundation
Saint Paul Police Federation
Saint Paul Police Reserves
Rare 1941 stop-motion animation color film entitled, "St. Paul Police Detectives and Their Work: A Color Chartoon"

Government of Saint Paul, Minnesota
Municipal police departments of Minnesota
1854 establishments in Minnesota Territory
Government agencies established in 1854